Kahlil Ameer "Kay" Felder Jr. (born March 29, 1995) is an American professional basketball player for the Shanxi Loongs of the Chinese Basketball Association (CBA). Felder, a  point guard, declared for the 2016 NBA draft at the conclusion of his junior year at Oakland. Felder is the Horizon League career assists leader.

High school career
Felder attended Pershing High School in Detroit, Michigan where he was named Public School League MVP his senior season. His senior year, he finished fourth in Mr. Basketball of Michigan voting.

He was not heavily recruited by high-major colleges and was noticed by Oakland assistant coach Saddi Washington. Felder was also recruited by Akron, Southern Illinois and St. Bonaventure. Oakland offered Felder a scholarship when he was a sophomore and he committed prior to his senior season. To show their commitment to him, Oakland did not recruit a point guard the season before he arrived so Felder knew there would be no competition.

College career

In 2013–14, Felder was named the Horizon League Freshman of the Year. As a sophomore in 2014–15, Felder finished second in the National Collegiate Athletic Association (NCAA) with 7.6 assists per game, two assists behind the leader, Jalan West of Northwestern State. He was also a finalist for the Lou Henson Award, given to the "Mid-Major Player of the Year".

Junior year (2015–16)
As a junior in 2015–16, Felder was consistently being evaluated as an NBA prospect, with professional scouts having attended Oakland's games. In December, playing against Washington, then-No. 1 Michigan State, and then-No. 5 Virginia, Felder averaged 35 points, 7 assists and made 47.9% of his field goals. Oakland led at halftime of each of those games, beating Washington, but losing to Michigan State and Virginia. Felder scored 37 points with nine assists against Michigan State in a 99–93 overtime loss at The Palace of Auburn Hills.

Felder was named a top-five finalist for the Bob Cousy Award, given to the top male point guard in Division I. He was also named the mid-season recipient of the Lute Olson Award, given annually to the most outstanding non-freshman men's college basketball player in NCAA Division I. He was placed on the mid-season watch list for the Naismith College Player of the Year.

Felder won the NCAA Player of the Week award on February 9, 2016. He also won six Horizon League Player of the Week awards during the season, tying the Horizon League record.

Despite using only three of his four years of college eligibility, Felder broke the Horizon League career assists mark of 699, which was originally set by Ralph Lee of Xavier in 1986. Felder also set the Oakland school record for consecutive free throws made, making 46 in a row with his last miss on January 29. Felder was named the Horizon League Player of the Year and earned All-Horizon League First Team honors.

On April 5, 2016, Felder declared for the 2016 NBA draft, forgoing his final year of college eligibility.

College statistics

Bold italics indicates led NCAA Division I

Professional career

Cleveland Cavaliers (2016–2017)

Despite his high marks in the draft combine, Felder was still projected to be a late second round draft pick, with the risk that he would perhaps not get drafted altogether. Felder was selected by the Atlanta Hawks with the 54th overall pick. He was later traded to the Cleveland Cavaliers on draft night, and in July 2016, he joined the Cavaliers for the 2016 NBA Summer League. On August 6, 2016, he signed a three-year, $2.4 million contract with the Cavaliers. He made his debut for the Cavaliers in their third game of the season on October 29, scoring two points in five minutes off the bench in a 105–99 win over the Orlando Magic. On December 14, with Kyrie Irving resting, Felder scored a season-high 14 in 23 minutes in a 93–85 loss to the Memphis Grizzlies. During his rookie season, he had multiple assignments with the Canton Charge of the NBA Development League.

On October 14, 2017, Felder was traded, along with Richard Jefferson, two future second-round draft picks and cash considerations, to the Atlanta Hawks in exchange for the rights to Sergiy Gladyr and Dimitrios Agravanis. He was immediately waived by the Hawks.

Chicago Bulls (2017)
On October 16, 2017, Felder was claimed off waivers by the Chicago Bulls. He was waived by the Bulls on December 19, 2017. He appeared in 14 games for Chicago and averaged 3.9 points, 1.0 rebounds and 1.4 assists in 9.6 minutes. He also played in three games for the Windy City Bulls and averaged 17.3 points, 3.6 rebounds and 4.6 assists, while shooting 45.2 percent from the field (19-of-42).

Detroit Pistons (2018)
On January 15, 2018, Felder signed a two-way contract with the Detroit Pistons, thus splitting his time between the Pistons and their NBA G League affiliate, the Grand Rapids Drive.

Raptors 905 (2018)
On August 21, 2018, Felder signed with the Toronto Raptors. On October 12, 2018 Felder was waived by the Raptors, just before the start of the regular season. He was then added to the Raptors’ G League affiliate, the Raptors 905. On December 3, 2018, Felder was waived by the Raptors 905.

Xinjiang Flying Tigers (2019–2020)
On March 25, 2019, Felder signed with the Xinjiang Flying Tigers. He was replaced by Ian Clark on January 14, 2020.

Zhejiang Guangsha Lions (2020–2021)
Felder joined the Zhejiang Guangsha Lions for the 2020–21 season. He averaged 13.1 points, 5.9 assists, 4.5 rebounds, and 1.8 steals per game.

Shanxi Loongs (2021–present)
In 2021, Felder signed with the Shanxi Loongs of the Chinese Basketball Association.

Career statistics

NBA Regular season

|-
| style="text-align:left;"| 
| style="text-align:left;"| Cleveland
| 42 || 0 || 9.2 || .392 || .318 || .714 || 1.0 || 1.4 || .4 || .2 || 4.0
|- 
| style="text-align:left;"| 
| style="text-align:left;"| Chicago
| 14 || 0 || 9.6 || .303 || .222 || .971 || 1.0 || 1.4 || .2 || .1 || 3.9
|- 
| style="text-align:left;"| 
| style="text-align:left;"| Detroit
| 2 || 0 || 3.0 || .250 || .000 || .000 || 2.0 || 0.0 || .0 || .0 || 1.0
|-  
| style="text-align:center;" colspan="2"| Career
| 58 || 0 || 9.2 || .363 || .268 || .754 || 1.0 || 1.4 || .4 || .1 || 3.9

CBA

Regular season

|-
| align="left" | 2020-21
| align="left" | Zhejiang
| 14 || 4 || 28.4 || .408 || .298 || .966 || 4.5 || 5.9 || 1.8 || 0.1 || 13.1
|-
| align="left" | 2021-22
| align="left" | Shanxi
| 35 || 34 || 31.9 || .444 || .335 || .886 || 6.5 || 10.0 || 2.6 || 0.2 || 24.7
|}

Playoffs

|-
| align="left" | 2020-21
| align="left" | Zhejiang
| 2 || 0 || 28.3 || .444 || .444 || .833 || 5.0 || 4.5 || 1.0 || 0.0 || 23.0
|}
Source: basketball-stats.de (Date: 26. March 2022)

Personal life
Felder's father, Kahlil Felder Sr, played basketball at Eastern Michigan from 1990 to 1992. Felder is also the younger cousin of former NBA player Steve Smith.

See also
List of shortest players in National Basketball Association history

References

External links

 Kay Felder at goldengrizzlies.com

1995 births
Living people
Place of birth missing (living people)
African-American basketball players
All-American college men's basketball players
American expatriate basketball people in Canada
American expatriate basketball people in China
American men's basketball players
Atlanta Hawks draft picks
Basketball players from Detroit
Canton Charge players
Chicago Bulls players
Cleveland Cavaliers players
Detroit Pistons players
Grand Rapids Drive players
Oakland Golden Grizzlies men's basketball players
Point guards
Raptors 905 players
Pershing High School alumni
Windy City Bulls players
Xinjiang Flying Tigers players
21st-century African-American sportspeople